The hartree (symbol: Eh or Ha), also known as the Hartree energy, is the unit of energy in the Hartree atomic units system, named after the British physicist Douglas Hartree. Its CODATA recommended value is  = 

The hartree energy is approximately the electric potential energy of the hydrogen atom in its ground state and, by the virial theorem, approximately twice its ionization energy; the relationships are not exact because of the finite mass of the nucleus of the hydrogen atom and relativistic corrections.

The hartree is usually used as a unit of energy in atomic physics and computational chemistry: for experimental measurements at the atomic scale, the electronvolt (eV) or the reciprocal centimetre (cm−1) are much more widely used.

Other relationships

= 2 Ry = 2 R∞hc
≜ 
≜ 
≜ 
≜ 
≜ 
≜ 
≜ 
≜ 

where:
ħ is the reduced Planck constant,
me is the electron rest mass,
e is the elementary charge,
a0 is the Bohr radius,
ε0 is the electric constant, 
c is the speed of light in vacuum, and
α is the fine-structure constant.

Also, the electron mass is replaced by the effective band mass . The effective hartree in semiconductors becomes small enough to be measured in millielectronvolts (meV).

References

Units of energy
Physical constants